Ramirás is a municipality in Ourense in the Galicia region of north-west Spain. It lies towards the south-west of the province.

References  

Municipalities in the Province of Ourense